Dirnbir is a rural locality in the North Burnett Region, Queensland, Australia.

Geography 
The Burnett River forms the southern boundary of the locality at an elevation of  while Reid Creek (a tributary of the Burnett River) forms the eastern boundary. A number of creeks rise in the locality and flow south or east to become tributaries of the Burnett River or Reid Creek respectively.

The more mountainous areas are undeveloped land. The predominant land use is grazing with some irrigated farming near the Burnett River.

History 
The locality takes its name from the Dirnbir railway station on the now closed Mungar Junction to Monto branch railway. The Queensland Railways Department named the station on 28 February 1913 using an Aboriginal word meaning grey ironbark tree.

Prior to 1913 Mount Debateable railway station was known as Buckingah railway station.

Dirnbir State School opened circa 1915 and closed circa 1933.

Education 
There are no schools in Dirnbir. The nearest primary and secondary schools are in neighbouring Gayndah.

Attractions 
 A viewing platform at McConnell Lookout provides panoramic views eastward and southward. There is much to observe on the drive to the lookout and once there the facilities included are  public toilets, sheltered picnic tables, a fire pit, rubbish bins, car park, and information. The drive to the lookout has a steep gradient not suitable for caravans and large vehicles.

The Burnett River Bridges section of the Boyne Burnett Inland Rail Trail was opened on 10 September 2022 at Mt Debateable Railway Station, Mt Debateable Road, Gayndah.  Sixteen kilometers of this section lies beside the Burnett River. The Red Gulley Bridge, Slab Creek Bridge, Spring Creek Bridge, Boomerang Bridge, Humphery Bridges Numbers 1, 2 ("Faith" Bridge or "bridge of faith"), and 3 and Roth's Bridge are passed on the way to the other end at Mundubbera Railway Precinct.  The Official Register of Engineering Heritage Markers listed Degilbo-Mundubbera Railway Bridges in October 2016.  A total of 12 bridges, including some on this section of Rail Trail, are recognized with one Engineering Heritage Marker representing the “best example of a collection of historic railway bridges in Australia”.

References 

North Burnett Region
Localities in Queensland